Zdeněk Kolář and Andrea Vavassori were the defending champions but chose not to defend their title.

Nuno Borges and Francisco Cabral won the title after defeating Andrej Martin and Gonçalo Oliveira 6–3, 6–4 in the final.

Seeds

Draw

References

External links
 Main draw

Maia Challenger - Doubles